Niagara Falls School District Administration Building is a historic government building located at Niagara Falls, Niagara County, New York. It was built in 1927–1928, and is a two-story, 14-by-5-bay, buff-colored brick building with Classical Revival detailing. It has a flat roof, limestone trim, a partially exposed finished basement, and rear ell.  It features a pedimented central entry portico and arched first floor windows.  It remained in use by the city schools until 2007.

It was listed on the National Register of Historic Places in 2014.

References

Government buildings on the National Register of Historic Places in New York (state)
Neoclassical architecture in New York (state)
Government buildings completed in 1928
Buildings and structures in Niagara Falls, New York
National Register of Historic Places in Niagara County, New York